Floriani is an Italian surname. Notable people with the surname include:

Francesco Floriani (fl. 1568), Italian painter
Pietro Paolo Floriani (1585–1638), Italian engineer and architect
Yuri Floriani (born 1981), Italian steeplechase runner

Italian-language surnames